Jan Maciej Błachowicz (born 24 February 1983) is a Polish professional mixed martial artist. He currently competes in the Light Heavyweight division for the Ultimate Fighting Championship (UFC), where he is a former UFC Light Heavyweight Champion. A professional since 2007, he also competed for KSW and is the former KSW Light Heavyweight Champion. He is the second Polish champion in UFC history, after Joanna Jędrzejczyk, and the first male Polish champion.  As of January 24, 2023, he is #3 in the UFC light heavyweight rankings.

Background
Growing up in Cieszyn, Poland, Błachowicz started training martial arts – initially judo at the age of nine – due to the influence of action movies.

Mixed martial arts career

KSW
Błachowicz entered in KSWs inaugural <95 kg (209 lb) Tournament at KSW 9. Defeating three opponents in one night, Błachowicz was able to claim the tournament crown. His first opponent was Martin Zawada, who he defeated by unanimous decision. Błachowicz was able to defeat his next two opponents by armbar, including the notable opponent Antoni Chmielewski.

Błachowicz went on to defeat Christian M'Pumbu four months later via armbar, before defeating previously unbeaten Maro Perak in December 2008.

Looking to expand his horizons after the very successful year 2008, Błachowicz accepted the invitation of Tomasz Drwal and joined him at the Throwdown Training Center in San Diego for a few months. He agreed to temporarily fight at Heavyweight, against Lloyd Marshbanks under the War Gods banner, but the event was canceled. Despite suffering a serious knee injury in July, Błachowicz continued his training, as he agreed to fight "somewhere in Mexico". About three weeks later, his knee suddenly popped in training when executing a takedown. The anterior cruciate ligament in his right knee was destroyed, making a knee reconstruction after his return to Poland inevitable.

Return to MMA
Błachowicz was planning his comeback fight in March against Aleksandar Radosavljevic at WFC 10, but decided to withdraw and was replaced by fellow KSW TEAM member Antoni Chmielewski. After finally returning from the knee injury and 17 months layoff, Błachowicz entered into the second KSW <95 kg tournament. Błachowicz had to face two opponents in the same night. His first opponent was the undefeated Brazilian Julio Brutus. Błachowicz was able to knock Brutus out with a high kick-right hook combination at 3:40 in the first round. In the semifinal, Błachowicz submitted his training partner Wojciech Orłowski with a rear-naked choke after just 1:37.

In the meantime, Błachowicz took a fight on a few days notice against Nikolai Onikienko and submitted him in the second round.

He then faced Daniel Tabera in the final of the tournament at KSW XIV, winning via TKO in the second round and becoming once again the KSW Light Heavyweight Tournament Champion.
Błachowicz then faced Rameau Thierry Sokoudjou for the vacant KSW Light Heavyweight Championship at KSW XV. He lost the fight via TKO, being unable to answer the bell for the third round because of his injured leg.

Błachowicz had a rematch with Sokoudjou at KSW XVII. He won the bout via unanimous decision to become the new KSW Light Heavyweight Champion. His next three fights in KSW were against Mario Miranda, Houston Alexander and Goran Reljic, and all three he won by unanimous decision.

Ultimate Fighting Championship
In January 2014, after completing a 17–3 record on the European scene, Błachowicz signed a contract to fight in the light heavyweight division of the UFC.

In his UFC debut, Błachowicz faced Ilir Latifi on October 4, 2014, at UFC Fight Night 53. He won the fight via TKO in the first round.

Błachowicz faced Jimi Manuwa on April 11, 2015, at UFC Fight Night 64. Błachowicz lost the fight via unanimous decision.

Błachowicz was expected to face Anthony Johnson on September 5, 2015, at UFC 191. However, Johnson was pulled from the bout on July 30 in favor of a fight with Jimi Manuwa at the event. In turn, Błachowicz instead faced Corey Anderson on the same card. He lost the fight via unanimous decision.

Błachowicz next faced Igor Pokrajac on April 10, 2016, at UFC Fight Night 86. He won the fight via unanimous decision.

Błachowicz faced Alexander Gustafsson on September 3, 2016, at UFC Fight Night 93. He lost the fight via unanimous decision.

Błachowicz was expected to face Ovince Saint Preux on February 4, 2017, at UFC Fight Night 104. However, he pulled out on January 21 due to injury and was replaced by promotional newcomer Volkan Oezdemir.

Błachowicz was quickly rescheduled and faced Patrick Cummins on April 8, 2017, at UFC 210. After a strong first round where he rocked Cummins on multiple occasions, Błachowicz soon fell to Cummins' wrestling and his own lack of stamina in the second and third rounds. He lost the fight via majority decision.

Błachowicz faced Devin Clark on October 21, 2017, at UFC Fight Night: Cowboy vs. Till. He won the fight via rear-naked choke submission in the second round. This win earned him the Performance of the Night award.

Błachowicz faced Jared Cannonier on December 16, 2017, at UFC on Fox 26. He won the fight via unanimous decision.

Błachowicz faced Jimi Manuwa in a rematch on March 17, 2018, at UFC Fight Night 127. He won the fight via unanimous decision. The win also earned him his first Fight of the Night bonus award.

Błachowicz faced Nikita Krylov on September 15, 2018, at UFC Fight Night 136. He won the fight via arm-triangle choke submission in the second round. This win earned him the Performance of the Night award.

Błachowicz faced Thiago Santos on February 23, 2019, at UFC Fight Night 145. Błachowicz was caught with a counter in the third round and lost by TKO, marking the first time in his MMA career that he has been stopped due to strikes.

Błachowicz faced Luke Rockhold on July 6, 2019, at UFC 239. He won the fight via knockout in the second round. This win earned him the Performance of the Night award.

Błachowicz then faced Ronaldo Souza on November 16, 2019, at UFC Fight Night 164. He won the fight by a split decision.

Błachowicz faced Corey Anderson on February 15, 2020, at UFC Fight Night 167 in a rematch of their previous bout. Błachowicz won the bout via first-round knockout. The victory earned him his fourth Performance of the Night bonus award.

UFC Light Heavyweight Champion
Błachowicz faced Dominick Reyes for the vacant UFC Light Heavyweight Championship on September 27, 2020, at UFC 253. He won the fight via TKO in the second round. This win earned him the Performance of the Night award.

Błachowicz faced former UFC Middleweight Champion Israel Adesanya for his first title defense on March 6, 2021, at UFC 259. He won the fight via unanimous decision, becoming the first person to defeat Adesanya in mixed martial arts.

Błachowicz was expected to make his second title defense against Glover Teixeira at UFC 266 on September 25, 2021. However, the bout was postponed and moved to October 30, 2021, at UFC 267. Błachowicz lost the fight and the title via second-round rear-naked choke submission.

Post championship
Błachowicz was scheduled to face Aleksandar Rakić on March 26, 2022, at UFC on ESPN 33. However, in late January, Błachowicz withdrew due to injury and the bout was rescheduled for UFC on ESPN 36 on May 14, 2022. Błachowicz won the fight via technical knockout after Rakić was rendered unable to continue in the third round due to a knee injury.

Błachowicz faced off against Magomed Ankalaev on December 10, 2022, at UFC 282 for the vacant UFC Light Heavyweight Championship.  The fight ended in a controversial split draw. 23 out of 25 media members scored the fight as a win for Ankalaev.

Personal life
Błachowicz is a close friend of former UFC fighter Tomasz Drwal. They were training together at the Throwdown Training Center in San Diego when he suffered his knee injury in 2009.
Some time ago he moved to Warsaw with his girlfriend, changing his long-time club Octagon Rybnik to Paweł Nastula's club. He also occasionally trains in Alliance MMA with names such as Alexander Gustafsson, Phil Davis, Joey Beltran, and Dominick Cruz.

Błachowicz confirmed the birth of his son on December 15, 2020.

Championships and accomplishments
Ultimate Fighting Championship
UFC Light Heavyweight Championship (One time)
One successful title defense
Performance of the Night (Five times) 
Fight of the Night (One time) vs. Jimi Manuwa 
Konfrontacja Sztuk Walki
KSW Light Heavyweight Championship (One time; former)
Two successful title defenses
KSW 2010 Light Heavyweight Tournament Winner
KSW 2008 Light Heavyweight Tournament Winner
KSW 2007 Light Heavyweight Tournament Winner
Fight of the Night (Three times)
Muay Thai
2008: European Open Cup − 1st place, 91 kg (A class)
2008: IFMA World Championships − 1st place, 91 kg (B class)
2007: IFMA World Championships − 3rd place, 91 kg (B class)
2007: Polish Championships − 1st place, over 91 kg
2006: Polish Cup − 3rd place 91 kg
Grappling
2007: Polish BJJ League − 1st place, 98 kg
2007: Polish Open Submission Fighting Championships − 2nd place, 99 kg
2007: Polish BJJ Cup − 1st place, 97 kg
2005: Polish BJJ Championships − 3rd place, open
2005: Polish BJJ Cup − 1st place, over 91 kg

Pay-per-view bouts

Mixed martial arts record

|- 
|Draw
|align=center|
|Magomed Ankalaev
|Draw (split)
|UFC 282
|
|align=center|5
|align=center|5:00
|Las Vegas, Nevada, United States
|
|-
|Win
|align=center|29–9 
|Aleksandar Rakić 
|TKO (knee injury)
|UFC on ESPN: Błachowicz vs. Rakić 
| 
|align=center|3
|align=center|1:11
|Las Vegas, Nevada, United States
|
|-
|Loss
|align=center|28–9
|Glover Teixeira 
|Submission (rear-naked choke)
|UFC 267 
|
|align=center|2
|align=center|3:02
|Abu Dhabi, United Arab Emirates  
|
|-
|Win
|align=center|28–8
|Israel Adesanya
|Decision (unanimous)
|UFC 259
|
|align=center|5
|align=center|5:00
|Las Vegas, Nevada, United States
|
|-
|Win
|align=center|27–8
|Dominick Reyes
|TKO (punches)
|UFC 253
|
|align=center|2
|align=center|4:36
|Abu Dhabi, United Arab Emirates
|
|-
|Win
|align=center|26–8
|Corey Anderson
|KO (punch)
|UFC Fight Night: Anderson vs. Błachowicz 2 
|
|align=center|1
|align=center|3:08
|Rio Rancho, New Mexico, United States
|
|-
|Win
|align=center|25–8
|Ronaldo Souza
|Decision (split) 
|UFC Fight Night: Błachowicz vs. Jacaré 
|
|align=center|5
|align=center|5:00
|São Paulo, Brazil 
|
|-
|Win
|align=center|24–8
|Luke Rockhold
|KO (punches)
|UFC 239 
|
|align=center|2
|align=center|1:39
|Las Vegas, Nevada, United States
|
|-
|Loss
|align=center|23–8
|Thiago Santos
|TKO (punches)
|UFC Fight Night: Błachowicz vs. Santos
|
|align=center|3
|align=center|0:39
|Prague, Czech Republic
|
|-
|Win
|align=center|23–7
|Nikita Krylov
|Submission (arm-triangle choke)
|UFC Fight Night: Hunt vs. Oleinik
|
|align=center|2
|align=center|2:41
|Moscow, Russia
|
|-
|Win
|align=center|22–7
|Jimi Manuwa
|Decision (unanimous)
|UFC Fight Night: Werdum vs. Volkov
|
|align=center|3
|align=center|5:00
|London, England
|
|-
|Win
|align=center|21–7
|Jared Cannonier
|Decision (unanimous)
|UFC on Fox: Lawler vs. dos Anjos
|
|align=center|3
|align=center|5:00
|Winnipeg, Manitoba, Canada
|
|-
|Win
|align=center|20–7
|Devin Clark
|Submission (rear-naked choke)
|UFC Fight Night: Cowboy vs. Till
|
|align=center|2
|align=center|3:02
|Gdańsk, Poland
|
|-
|Loss
|align=center|19–7
|Patrick Cummins
|Decision (majority)
|UFC 210
|
|align=center|3
|align=center|5:00
|Buffalo, New York, United States
|
|-
|Loss
|align=center|19–6
|Alexander Gustafsson
|Decision (unanimous)
|UFC Fight Night: Arlovski vs. Barnett
|
|align=center|3
|align=center|5:00
|Hamburg, Germany
|
|-
|Win
|align=center|19–5
|Igor Pokrajac
|Decision (unanimous)
|UFC Fight Night: Rothwell vs. dos Santos
|
|align=center|3
|align=center|5:00
|Zagreb, Croatia
|
|-
| Loss
| align=center| 18–5
| Corey Anderson
| Decision (unanimous)
| UFC 191
| 
| align=center| 3
| align=center| 5:00
| Las Vegas, Nevada, United States
|
|-
| Loss
| align=center| 18–4
| Jimi Manuwa
| Decision (unanimous)
| UFC Fight Night: Gonzaga vs. Cro Cop 2
| 
| align=center| 3
| align=center| 5:00
| Kraków, Poland
|
|-
| Win
| align=center| 18–3
| Ilir Latifi
| TKO (body kick and punches)
| UFC Fight Night: Nelson vs. Story
| 
| align=center| 1
| align=center| 1:58
| Stockholm, Sweden
|
|-
| Win
| align=center| 17–3
| Goran Reljić
| Decision (unanimous)
| KSW 22
| 
| align=center| 3
| align=center| 5:00
| Warsaw, Poland
|  
|-
| Win
| align=center| 16–3
| Houston Alexander
| Decision (unanimous)
| KSW 20
| 
| align=center| 3
| align=center| 5:00
| Gdańsk, Poland
|  
|-
| Win
| align=center| 15–3
| Mario Miranda
| Decision (unanimous)
| KSW 18
| 
| align=center| 3
| align=center| 5:00
| Płock, Poland
|  
|-
| Win
| align=center| 14–3
| Rameau Thierry Sokoudjou
| Decision (unanimous)
| KSW 17
| 
| align=center| 3
| align=center| 5:00
| Lódz, Poland
|  
|-
| Win
| align=center| 13–3
| Toni Valtonen
| Submission (rear-naked choke)
| KSW 16
| 
| align=center| 2
| align=center| 1:23
| Gdańsk, Poland
|
|-
| Loss
| align=center| 12–3
| Rameau Thierry Sokoudjou
| TKO (leg injury)
| KSW 15
| 
| align=center| 2
| align=center| 5:00
| Warsaw, Poland
|  
|-
| Win
| align=center| 12–2
| Daniel Tabera
| TKO (punches)
| KSW 14
| 
| align=center| 2
| align=center| 4:20
| Lódz, Poland
|  
|-
| Win
| align=center| 11–2
| Nikolai Onikienko
| Submission (rear-naked choke)
| World Absolute FC
| 
| align=center| 2
| align=center| 2:32
| Cheboksary, Russia
|
|-
| Win
| align=center| 10–2
| Wojciech Orłowski
| Submission (rear-naked choke)
| rowspan=2| KSW 13
| rowspan=2| 
| align=center| 1
| align=center| 1:37
| rowspan=2| Katowice, Poland
| 
|-
| Win
| align=center| 9–2
| Julio Brutus
| KO (head kick and punch)
| align=center| 1
| align=center| 3:40
|  
|-
| Win
| align=center| 8–2
| Maro Perak
| Submission (rear-naked choke)
| KSW 10
| 
| align=center| 2
| align=center| 1:51
| Warsaw, Poland
|
|-
| Win
| align=center| 7–2
| Christian M'Pumbu
| Submission (armbar)
| KSW Extra
| 
| align=center| 2
| align=center| 3:12
| Dąbrowa Górnicza, Poland
|
|-
| Win
| align=center| 6–2
| Aziz Karaoglu
| Submission (armbar)
| rowspan=3| KSW IX
| rowspan=3| 
| align=center| 1
| align=center| 4:13
| rowspan=3| Warsaw, Poland
| 
|-
| Win
| align=center| 5–2
| Antoni Chmielewski
| Submission (armbar)
| align=center| 2
| align=center| 2:54
|  
|-
| Win
| align=center| 4–2
| Martin Zawada
| Decision (unanimous)
| align=center| 2
| align=center| 5:00
|  
|-
| Loss
| align=center| 3–2
| Andre Fyeet
| Submission (kimura)
| KSW VIII
| 
| align=center| 1
| align=center| 1:57
| Warsaw, Poland
|
|-
| Win
| align=center| 3–1
| Daniel Dowda
| TKO (knee and punches)
| rowspan=3| KSW Elimination 1
| rowspan=3| 
| align=center| 1
| align=center| 1:35
| rowspan=3| Wrocław, Poland
|  
|-
| Win
| align=center| 2–1
| Pawel Gasinski
| TKO (punches)
| align=center| 1
| align=center| 2:36
|  
|-
| Win
| align=center| 1–1
| Sebastian Olchawa
| Decision (unanimous)
| align=center| 2
| align=center| 5:00
|  
|-
| Loss
| align=center| 0–1
| Marcin Krysztofiak
| Decision (unanimous)
| FCP 3: Khalidov vs. Troeng
| 
| align=center| 2
| align=center| 5:00
| Poznań, Poland
|

See also
 List of current UFC fighters
 List of male mixed martial artists
 List of UFC champions

References

External links
 
 

1983 births
Living people
Polish male mixed martial artists
Light heavyweight mixed martial artists
Mixed martial artists utilizing Muay Thai
Mixed martial artists utilizing judo
Mixed martial artists utilizing Brazilian jiu-jitsu
Polish practitioners of Brazilian jiu-jitsu
People awarded a black belt in Brazilian jiu-jitsu
Polish Muay Thai practitioners
Polish male judoka
People from Cieszyn
Sportspeople from Silesian Voivodeship
Ultimate Fighting Championship male fighters
Ultimate Fighting Championship champions